Thomas Butler (April 14, 1785 – August 7, 1847) was a member of the U.S. House of Representatives from 1818 to 1821 representing the state of Louisiana. He served one and a half terms as a Democratic-Republican.

Butler was born near Carlisle, Pennsylvania. He was selected in a special election to finish the term of Thomas B. Robertson in 1818 and was re-elected the same year to the Sixteenth Congress. He was later a member of the Whig party and of the American Party.  He died in St. Louis, Missouri.

Butler ran for Governor of Louisiana in the 1824 election but placed last with a mere 3% of the vote. In 1828 Butler again ran unsuccessfully for governor, placing second behind fellow National Republican Pierre Derbigny.

External links 

1785 births
1847 deaths
People from Carlisle, Pennsylvania
Louisiana Whigs
Louisiana Know Nothings
Democratic-Republican Party members of the United States House of Representatives from Louisiana
19th-century American politicians